Katrina is an Australian television talk show aired on ATV-0 (now ATV-10 and part of Network Ten) in Melbourne in 1967. Hosted by Katrina Pye, the talk show aired in a 15-minute time-slot. Following the end of the series, Pye moved to another ATV-0 series, Chit-Chat.

Despite a considerable trend towards "national" series for prime-time shows, many Australian daytime shows remained single-city-only at the time. Archival status of the series is not known, and it is possible the series was wiped.

References

External links
Katrina on IMDb

1967 Australian television series debuts
1967 Australian television series endings
Australian television talk shows
Black-and-white Australian television shows
English-language television shows